George Glacier is a valley glacier in the western part of the Anare Mountains of Victoria Land, Antarctica. The glacier rises east of Mount Burch and flows northwest past Mount Kelly to Lillie Glacier Tongue on the coast. This geographical feature was first mapped by the United States Geological Survey from surveys and U.S. Navy air photos, 1960–1965, and was named by the Advisory Committee on Antarctic Names for Robert Y. George, a zoologist at McMurdo Station, Hut Point Peninsula, Ross Island, 1967–1968. The glacier is situated on the Pennell Coast, a portion of Antarctica lying between Cape Williams and Cape Adare.

References

Glaciers of Pennell Coast